Massachusetts Senate's 1st Middlesex district in the United States is one of 40 legislative districts of the Massachusetts Senate. It covers portions of Middlesex county. Democrat Ed Kennedy of Lowell has represented the district since 2019.

Locales represented
The district includes the following localities:
 Dunstable
 Groton
 Lowell
 Pepperell
 Tyngsborough
 Westford

The current district geographic boundary overlaps with those of the Massachusetts House of Representatives' 1st Middlesex, 2nd Middlesex, 16th Middlesex, 17th Middlesex, 18th Middlesex, and 36th Middlesex districts.

Former locale
The district previously covered Charlestown, circa 1860s.

Senators 
 E.L. Norton, circa 1859 
 Andrew J. Bailey, circa 1874
 James Vahey
 James MacPherson
 Abbott Rice
 Arthur W. Hollis, circa 1935 
 Joseph F. Montminy, circa 1945 
 Paul Achin, circa 1953
 Edward Joseph DeSaulnier, Jr., circa 1957 
 John Edward Harrington, Jr., circa 1969 
 Bernard Joseph Tully, circa 1979 
 Philip Shea, circa 1983
 Paul J. Sheehy, circa 1985 
 Nancy Achin Sullivan, circa 1991
 Daniel P. Leahy, circa 1993 
 Steven C. Panagiotakos, circa 2002 
 Eileen Donoghue
 Edward J. Kennedy, 2019-current

Images
Portraits of legislators

See also
 List of Massachusetts Senate elections
 List of Massachusetts General Courts
 List of former districts of the Massachusetts Senate
 Other Middlesex County districts of the Massachusett Senate: 2nd, 3rd, 4th, 5th; 1st Essex and Middlesex; 2nd Essex and Middlesex; 1st Middlesex and Norfolk, 2nd Middlesex and Norfolk; Middlesex and Suffolk; Middlesex and Worcester; Norfolk, Bristol and Middlesex; 1st Suffolk and Middlesex; 2nd Suffolk and Middlesex
 Middlesex County districts of the Massachusetts House of Representatives: 1st, 2nd, 3rd, 4th, 5th, 6th, 7th, 8th, 9th, 10th, 11th, 12th, 13th, 14th, 15th, 16th, 17th, 18th, 19th, 20th, 21st, 22nd, 23rd, 24th, 25th, 26th, 27th, 28th, 29th, 30th, 31st, 32nd, 33rd, 34th, 35th, 36th, 37th

References

Further reading

External links
 Ballotpedia
  (State Senate district information based on U.S. Census Bureau's American Community Survey).
 
 League of Women Voters of Westford

Senate
Government of Middlesex County, Massachusetts
Massachusetts Senate